Fausto Genaro Mata Ortiz (born October 13, 1971 in La Zurza, Santo Domingo), also known as Boca de Piano, is a Dominican comedian and actor. In 2006 he started a TV show named Boca de Piano es un show.

He has also had a successful film acting career in movies like Perico Ripiao (2003), Papá se volvió loco (2005) and Sanky Panky (2007).

Career
Fausto attended Universidad Nacional Pedro Henríquez Ureña  also known as Sergio Adonis Guzmán Martínez, but before graduation decided to be an actor. He then attended the School of Fine Arts. He played a number of parts in the Theater Cocuyo, Charlotte Carter. His first role in television came when Juan Ramón Gómez Díaz saw him performing a character at the El Conuco restaurant.

Fausto worked as a comedian. His first film role was to star in the Dominican film "Sanky Panky" (José Enrique Pintor). Fausto then returned to the comedy theater "Politically Incorrect" (Ray Cooney) in a production of Rafael Ovalles. Most recently, he starred in Detective Willy.

Filmography

References

External links
 
 

1971 births
Living people
People from Santo Domingo
Dominican Republic male film actors
Dominican Republic male television actors
Dominican Republic male comedians
Universidad Nacional Pedro Henríquez Ureña alumni